Loncomilla River (Mapudungun for "Gold of the Chief") is a tributary to the Maule river in Linares Province, Maule Region, Chile. Two rivers join to form the Loncomilla River: the Perquilauquén river and Longaví river.

See also
 List of rivers of Chile

References

External links
Loncomilla River, between San Javier and Villa Alegre, Chile

Rivers of Chile
Rivers of Maule Region